The 2003 U.S. Figure Skating Championships took place between January 12–19, 2003 at the American Airlines Center in Dallas, Texas. Medals were awarded in four colors: gold (first), silver (second), bronze (third), and pewter (fourth) in four disciplines – men's singles, ladies' singles, pair skating, and ice dancing – across three levels: senior, junior, and novice.

The event was used to determine the U.S. teams for the 2003 World Championships, 2003 Four Continents Championships, and 2003 World Junior Championships.

"Disaster in Dallas"
The 2003 Nationals are generally considered to be one of the worst-skated championships in U.S. championships history with the name "Disaster in Dallas" being given to the event.

The senior men's and pairs competitions were the most notable "disaster" of the night. Johnny Weir, who had been in medal contention after the short program, hit the barrier during his free skating, got up and restarted his program, then had to withdraw, starting a long chain of bad skating in the men's free. Also, there were numerous errors in the pairs event.

Senior results

Men

Ladies

Pairs

Ice dancing

Junior results

Men

Ladies

Pairs

Ice dancing

Novice results

Men

Ladies

Pairs

Ice dancing

International team selections

World Championships

Four Continents Championships

World Junior Championships

References

External links
 2003 United States Figure Skating Championships

U.S. Figure Skating Championships
United States Figure Skating Championships
United States Figure Skating Championships, 2003
U.S. Figure Skating Championships
U.S. Figure Skating Championships